Pizzonia is a surname. Notable people with the surname include:

 Antônio Pizzonia (born 1980), Brazilian racing driver
 Dominick Pizzonia (born 1941), American mobster
 Shaun Pizzonia (born 1968), American musician, DJ, sound engineer, and songwriter

See also
 Pizzoni, municipality in Calabria